PocketBook is a multinational company which produces e-book readers based on E Ink technology (an electronic paper technology) under the PocketBook brand. The company was founded in 2007 in Kyiv, Ukraine, and its headquarters were shifted to Lugano, Switzerland in 2012. These devices enable users to browse, buy, download, and read e-books, newspapers, magazines and other digital media via wireless networking to the PocketBook Store.

Development and manufacture 

The devices are assembled by factories such as  Foxconn, Wisky and Yitoa and shipped out to more than 40 countries.

Device list 

Models from same family sometimes use same model numbers such as :
 Touch HD   PB631...
 Touch HD 2  PB631-2...

Sales geography 

The company's products are sold in 35 countries worldwide – in Central, Eastern, and Western Europe, in Baltic and Commonwealth of Independent States countries, as well as in Australia, Israel, New Zealand, and others. , PocketBook claimed it had sold over two million e-reader and tablet devices.

History

See also 
 Comparison of e-book readers
 Comparison of tablet computers
 Tablet computer

References 

Electronics companies of Switzerland
Dedicated ebook devices
Tablet computers
Android (operating system) devices
Linux-based devices
Electronic paper technology
Information technology companies of Switzerland
Computer companies established in 2007
Electronics companies established in 2007
Ukrainian companies established in 2007
Foxconn